Målilla is a locality in Hultsfred Municipality, Kalmar County, Sweden with 1,524 inhabitants in 2010.

It is more commonly known as the temperature capital of Sweden due to records, both high and low, being set there. A Swedish record high temperature of +38 °C (100.4 °F) was set on June 29, 1947. This record is shared with Ultuna in Uppland. The lowest temperature recorded is −33.8 °C, one of the lowest ever recorded in southern Sweden.

Being famous for the extremes in temperature, the middle of the town's main roundabout features a 15 metre high thermometer. Shortly after its inauguration in December 2000, it was hit by a car and the bulb had to be replaced.

Målilla is further famous for motorcycle speedway. Dackarna Målilla, the original name of the team has changed due to sponsorship deals; Luxo Stars and Team Svelux were two passing names until the original name once again was reinstated. The team won the 2021 Swedish Speedway league in Eskilstuna and have raced at the Skrotfrag Arena since 1993.

Målilla has a bandy team, "Målilla Bandy", and is also known for adventurer and mountaineer Janne Corax who is the only Swedish alpinist with first ascents in the Himalayas on the CV.

Climate
The data from recent years shows the climate moving towards an oceanic climate, though still continental overall with significant differences between seasons. Whilst winter temperatures have been too cold to be oceanic, summers have become warmer on average. The highest temperature recorded since the all-time record-high temperature has been the  measured in July 2022 according to SMHI's data series.

Despite being prone to temperature extremes, Målilla has a relatively normal average climate for the southern parts of the country with slightly warmer days and colder nights than typical for the parallel, especially during spring, with April high temperatures averaging  for 2002–2014, but with night time lows being around freezing point. Other official statistical records include exceeding  in March, attaining  in April, and reaching  in October, all exceptionally warm by Swedish standards. In spite of this, the tied Swedish record of  set in June 1947 is the only national monthly record currently held by Målilla.

References 

Populated places in Kalmar County
Populated places in Hultsfred Municipality